Guntupalem is a village in Guntur district in the state of Andhra Pradesh, India.

References

Villages in Guntur district